The Siliștea is a right tributary of the river Valea Porumbenilor in Romania. It flows into the Valea Porumbenilor near Cucuruzu.

References

Rivers of Romania
Rivers of Giurgiu County